Heda may be:

Places
Heda, Shizuoka, Japan

People
 Antoni Heda (1916–2008), Polish military commander
 Willem Claeszoon Heda (1594–1680), Dutch painter of still lives
 Heda Margolius Kovály, Czech author

Other uses
Heda (schooner), a Russi-Japanese ship
Heda, an honorific for the Commander of the 12 clans (e.g., Lexa, her predecessors, and her successors) in the CW series The 100; in season 3, Clarke is widely referred to as "Wanheda" (Commander of Death)
Harmonically Enhanced Digital Audio (HEDA)